The 2012 China Masters Super Series was the seventh super series tournament of the 2012 BWF Super Series. The tournament was held in Changzhou, China from September 11–16, 2012 and had a total purse of $400,000. The draw was released on August 28, 2012.

Men's singles

Seeds

  Chen Long
  Chen Jin
  Kenichi Tago
  Du Pengyu
  Jan Ø. Jørgensen
  Hans-Kristian Vittinghus
  Wang Zhengming
  Kashyap Parupalli
  Hu Yun
  Wong Wing Ki
  Boonsak Ponsana
  Viktor Axelsen
  Ajay Jayaram
  Liew Daren
  Muhammad Hafiz Hashim
  Hsu Jen-hao

Players by nation

Top half

Bottom half

Finals

Women's singles

Seeds

  Wang Yihan
  Li Xuerui
  Wang Shixian
  Jiang Yanjiao
  Ratchanok Inthanon
  Porntip Buranaprasertsuk
  Liu Xin
  Gu Juan

Top half

Bottom half

Finals

Men's doubles

Top half

Bottom half

Finals

Women's doubles

Result

Mixed doubles

Seeds

  Xu Chen /  Ma Jin
  Sudket Prapakamol /  Saralee Thungthongkam
  Chan Peng Soon /  Goh Liu Ying
  Maneepong Jongjit /  Savitree Amitrapai

Result

References 

2012 China Masters Super Series
China Masters Super Series
Chinese Masters